Hnyihnu is a village in Ye Township in the Mon State of south-east Burma. It is located approximately 12 kilometres north-west of Ye city.

Nearby towns and villages include Andin (2.2 nm), Saiye (2.2 nm), Zuntalin (4.2 nm), Kyonpaw (4.0 nm) and Zayat (1.0 nm).

Populated places in Mon State